The Jennings Cup is the longest consecutively awarded ice hockey cup in the world. Presented in 1898 by William T. Jennings for the University of Toronto interfaculty ice hockey tournament, it has been disputed every year since then. At the present, it is disputed twice a year by the men's ice hockey teams of the three campuses of the University of Toronto.

History 
In 1898 the Jennings Cup was presented to the School of Practical Science, University of Toronto, for competition in ice hockey. Its presenter, William T. Jennings, was a civil engineer, a chairman in Engineering, and a hockey enthusiast who strongly believed in athletics. The donation of the cup brought attention to hockey at the university and stimulated an interfaculty competition.

Jennings Cup Winners

Interfaculty Tournament: 1899 - 1944

Intramural: 2001 - 2014

References

University of Toronto